Woodvale Cricket Club is a cricket club in Belfast, Northern Ireland, playing in the Premier League in the Northern Cricket Union (NCU). 

The club was formed in 1887.

Honours
NCU Senior League: 6 (1 shared)
1935, 1943, 1948, 1955, 1958 (shared), 1966
NCU Challenge Cup: 10
1933, 1937, 1939, 1941, 1948, 1949, 1950, 1952, 1954, 1998
NCU Junior Cup: ‡11
1909, †1951, †1955, †1960, †1962, †1976, †1980, †1982, †1989, †1993, †1995

‡ 10 won by 2nd XI
† Won by 2nd XI

References

External links
 Woodvale Cricket Club

Sports clubs in Belfast
Cricket clubs in Northern Ireland
NCU Senior League members
1887 establishments in Ireland
Cricket clubs in County Antrim